Paisley (Hamilton Street) railway station was an early railway station in Paisley, Renfrewshire, Scotland. It was built in 1837 by the Paisley and Renfrew Railway; and, together with the station at Renfrew Wharf, was one of two terminal stations on the line. Both stations offered passengers and goods facilities.

History
The station opened on 3 April 1837, with steam locomotive haulage on the  gauge, (Scotch gauge) line. The intention was to both supplement and complete with passenger and goods services on the River Cart between Paisley and Renfrew.

The station was entered through either carriage or foot-gates. These led to a booking office, with a passenger waiting room behind it; the upper floor, above, was reserved for the use of the manager. Behind this was the Train shed, which had two platforms running the whole length of the shed. There was a separate locomotive shed; and a goods warehouse, which had one railway line running through it.

During the summer months there was a half-hourly service, the journey took 12 minutes, with ten journeys in each direction per day.

In 1842, to save money, the steam locomotive was replaced by horse haulage.

Closure 
On 23 January 1866, train services were suspended on the line to enable the tracks to be doubled throughout; the line to be converted to Standard Gauge and for it to be connected to the Glasgow and Paisley Joint Railway, at Arkleston Junction.

Paisley Hamilton Street station closed on 1 February 1866; it was replaced by the Glasgow and South Western Railway's Paisley Abercorn station, when the line reopened on 1 May 1866.

The station is shown on an Ordnance Survey map of 1923, still with tracks in situ; it is marked as a goods station.

See also

References

Footnotes

Sources 
 
 
 

Disused railway stations in Renfrewshire
Railway stations in Great Britain opened in 1837
Railway stations in Great Britain closed in 1866
Former Glasgow and South Western Railway stations
1837 establishments in Scotland
1866 disestablishments in the United Kingdom
4 ft 6 in gauge railways in Scotland
Buildings and structures in Paisley, Renfrewshire
Transport in Paisley, Renfrewshire